CoRSU Rehabilitation Hospital, is a specialized surgical hospital in the Buganda Region of Uganda. The hospital focuses on the surgical correction and rehabilitation of orthopedic problems which account for over 50 percent of the patients served. About 45 percent of those served, receive plastic surgery, VVF repair and burns treatment.

Location
The hospital is located in Kisubi, a neighborhood in Wakiso District, in Uganda's Central Region (Buganda).

The coordinates of CoRSU Rehabilitation Hospital are 0°07'58.0"N, 32°32'08.0"E (Latitude:0.132778; Longitude:32.535556).

Overview
At this hospital children below the age of 18 are treated at no cost to the patient or family. As of December 2017, CoRSU Hospital Uganda maintained the following departments:

 Orthopedic Surgery
 Plastic Surgery
 Rehabilitative Services
 Nursing Services
 Nutrition Services
 Dental Services
 VVF Department 
 Private Patient Services
 Department of Community Outreach
 Human Resources Department
 Department of Strategic Information.

History
The hospital was established in 2006, as a non-government, non-profit organization by various stakeholders. Key among the founders and financial backers of CoRSU, is the international charity, Christian Blind Mission (CBM), whose main objective is the improvement and expansion of "the medical rehabilitation services for children and people with disability in Uganda". A private wing to cater to patients with the ability to pay, has been established to increase hospital revenue. Typically these patients have been travelling to Kenya, India, South Africa, Europe and North America, to receive specialized surgical services.

Disease profile
The surgical disease burden, at the hospital in 2017, is summarized in the table below:

Financials
According to the hospital's Annual Report for 2017, the hospital received funding from various international and domestic donors, amounting to USh 12,907,338,000 (approx. US$3,480,000). The biggest donor was CBM, accounting for about 43 percent of all donations. The two largest expenses were (a) staff salaries and allowances, accounting for 37 percent of total expenditure, followed by administration expenses which consumed just over 25 percent of all expenses in 2017.

See also
 List of hospitals in Uganda
 CURE Children's Hospital of Uganda
 Holy Innocents Children's Hospital
 Kisubi Hospital

References

External links
Website of CoRSU Rehabilitation Hospital, Uganda

Hospitals in Uganda
Hospitals established in 2006
2006 establishments in Uganda
Wakiso District